Moussa (sometimes spelled Mousa) is both a given name and a surname. It is a Gallicized spelling of the Arabic name Mūsā ("Moses"). Notable people with the name include:

Given name: Moussa
 Moussa Ag Amastan, Amenokal of the Kel Ahaggar Tuareg
 Moussa Arafat, cousin of late Palestinian leader Yasser Arafat
 Moussa Ayoub (c.1873–1955), Syrian-born British portrait artist
 Moussa Benhamadi (1953–2020), Algerian politician
 Moussa Coulibaly (footballer, born 1981), Malian football player
 Moussa Dembélé (French footballer) (born 1996), French footballer
 Moussa Dembélé (hurdler), Senegalese hurdler
 Moussa Diabaté (born 2002), French basketball player
 Moussa Diaby (born 1999),  French footballer 
 Moussa Faki (born 1960), Prime Minister of Chad
 Moussa Helal, former professional squash player
 Moussa Hojeij (born 1974), Lebanese football player
 Moussa Ibrahim (born 1974), Libyan spokesman for Muammar Gaddafi's regime
 Moussa Kermanian (1922–1980), Iranian Jewish community leader, businessman and journalist
 Moussa Konaté (born 1951), Malian writer
 Moussa Koussa (born c. 1949), former Libyan Minister of Foreign Affairs under Gaddafi
 Moussa Kouyate, kora player
 Moussa Latoundji (born 1978), Beninese football player
 Moussa N'Diaye (disambiguation)
 Moussa Narry (born 1986), Nigerian football midfielder
 Moussa Ouattara (disambiguation), several people
 Moussa Pokong (born 1987), Cameroonian football player
 Moussa Saïb (born 1969), Algerian footballer
 Moussa Sanogo (born 1985), footballer
 Moussa Sissoko (born 1989), French footballer
 Moussa Sow (born 1986), Senegalese footballer
 Moussa Sy (born 1979), Guinean football striker
 Moussa Sylla (disambiguation), several people
 Moussa Timbiné (born 1974), Malian politician
 Moussa Traoré (born 1936), Malian soldier and politician
 Moussa Wagué (born 1998), Senegalese footballer 
 Moussa Yahaya (born 1975), Nigerian football striker

Given name: Mousa 

 Mousa Dembélé (Belgian footballer) (born 1987), Belgian footballer
 Mousa Ghaninejad (born 1951), Iranian economist
 Mousa Hadid (born 1965), Palestinian civil engineer and politician
 Mousa Kalantari (born 1949), Iranian politician and government minister
 Mousa Khiabani (1947–1982), Iranian politician, leading member of MEK
 Mousa Kraish, American actor and director
 Mousa Mohammed Abu Marzook (born 1951), Palestinian senior member of Hamas
 Mousa Namjoo (1938–1981), Iranian military figure and government minister
 Mousa Qorbani, Iranian Shia cleric
 Mousa Refan (born 1958), Iranian electrical engineer and former military officer
 Mousa Shubairi Zanjani (born 1928), Iranian Twelver Shia Marja

Middle name
 Balla Moussa Keïta (1934–2001), Malian actor and comedian

Surname
 Abdul Halim Moussa (1930–2003), Egyptian police officer and interior minister
 Amr Moussa (born 1936), Egyptian politician and diplomat
 Franck Moussa (born 1989), Belgian footballer
 Hassan Moussa, imam of the Stockholm Mosque
 Hassen Moussa (born 1973), Tunisian judoka
 Idriss Ndele Moussa (1959–2013), Chadian dentist politician
 Mustapha Moussa (born 1962), boxer
 Raouf Salama Moussa (1929–2006), notable Egyptian bacteriologist and editor
 Salama Moussa (1887–1958), Egyptian journalist and reformer
 Sameera Moussa (1917–1952), Egyptian nuclear scientist
 Samy Moussa (born 1984), Canadian conductor and composer
 Tarek El Moussa (born 1981), American businessman and television personality
 Zara Moussa (born c. 1980), Nigerian singer and rapper

See also

 Moussa Castle, Lebanon
 Mousa, the island in Shetland
 Musa (disambiguation)
 Musa, the Israelite prophet known to Christians and Jews as Moses; see Islamic view of Moses

Surnames of Nigerien origin
Arabic-language surnames
Surnames of Chadian origin